Higuchi Station can refer to two different train stations in Japan:
, on the Chichibu Main Line located in Nagatoro, Saitama, Japan
, on the Mooka Line located in Chikusei, Ibaraki, Japan